Ruairidh Greenwood (born 26 March 1992) is a Scottish curler. He competed at the 2015 Ford World Men's Curling Championship in Halifax, Nova Scotia, Canada, as second for the Scottish team. He is a left-handed delivery.

He is a 2015 Scottish men's champion curler.

References

External links

1992 births
Living people
Scottish male curlers
Scottish curling champions
Place of birth missing (living people)